Keisuke Yoshida may refer to:

, Japanese film director and screenwriter
, Japanese swimmer